Empis planetica is a species of dance flies, in the fly family Empididae. It is included in the subgenus Empis. It is found in Ireland and Great Britain and from Scandinavia south to Italy.

References

External links
Fauna Europaea

Empis
Diptera of Scandinavia
Diptera of Europe
Taxa named by James Edward Collin
Insects described in 1927